Sam Bahour is an American businessman and entrepreneur.

Early life and education 
Bahour was born in Ohio in 1964, to a Palestinian father and Lebanese-American mother. He moved with his family to the West Bank in the 1990s following the signing of Oslo Accords to become involved in developing the economy of the future Palestinian state.

He graduated from Youngstown State University in 1989 with a degree in computer technology, and subsequently worked for several American software firms, before moving to the West Bank in 1995.

Career 
Since relocating to the West Bank, Bahour has been involved in numerous business development initiatives. He was part of a group of businessmen who established the Palestine Telecommunications Company.  He also founded several private businesses, and was part of a plan to open a Western-style shopping center in the West Bank. In addition, he earned an MBA in a joint program between Northwestern University in Illinois and Tel Aviv University in Israel.

He has voiced support on Twitter for the Boycott, Divestment and Sanctions Movement. 

On 6 April 2021, Bahour, along with American-Israeli professor Bernard Avishai, addressed J Street on the topic of the confederation model for resolving the Israeli-Palestinian conflict.

References

External links
 Sam Bahour's webpage & blog

Living people
American people of Palestinian descent
American people of Lebanese descent
1964 births
20th-century American businesspeople